Layers is the sixth studio album by American rapper Royce da 5'9". The album was released on April 15, 2016, by Bad Half Entertainment.

Critical reception

Layers received generally positive reviews from music critics. At Metacritic, which assigns a normalized rating out of 100 to reviews from mainstream critics, the album received an average score of 77 based on 6 reviews, which indicates "generally favorable reviews".

Commercial performance
In the United States, the album debuted at number 22 on the Billboard 200, selling 16,749 copies in its first week. It was the eleventh best-selling album of the week. Layers was the first Royce's solo album to debut at number one on the Billboard Top R&B/Hip-Hop Albums. The album was also streamed 1.7 million times in the first week. In its second week the album fell to number 187 on the Billboard 200 chart.

Track listing

Charts

References

2016 albums
Royce da 5'9" albums
Albums produced by Mr. Porter
Albums produced by DJ Khalil
Albums produced by Jake One
Albums produced by Nottz
Albums produced by Symbolyc One